Saint-Alphonse/Lac Cloutier Water Aerodrome  is located on Lac Cloutier,  east southeast of Saint-Alphonse, Quebec, Canada.

References

Registered aerodromes in Montérégie
Seaplane bases in Quebec
La Haute-Yamaska Regional County Municipality